Adventures of the Little Koala (known in Japan as ) is an anime television series produced by Tohokushinsha Film Corporation. It aired originally in Japan on TV Tokyo from October 4, 1984, through March 28, 1985, and then aired in the United States on Nickelodeon (later moved into the Nick Jr. block upon its launch at the start of 1988) dubbed in English from June 1, 1987, until April 2, 1993. The storyline revolved around Roobear Koala (voiced in English by former child actor Steven Bednarski) and his friends and their utopian village in a fictional version of New South Wales, Australia, known in the Japanese version as Yukari Village, within the shadow of a real rock formation known as The Breadknife.

Production of the English and French versions of the series was done by the Canadian studio Cinar Films.

It also aired in Australia, New Zealand, Canada, Greece, Italy, France, the United Kingdom, in the Arabic-speaking world, and other countries, but its biggest success by far was in the United States on Nickelodeon.

Characters

Historical background 
Adventures of the Little Koala was made as Japan was in the midst of a koala frenzy along with another koala themed anime titled ふしぎなコアラ ブリンキー (The Wondrous Koala Blinky), which would later be broadcast alongside Little Koala on Nickelodeon's Nick Jr. block in 1988, as Noozles. According to The Anime Encyclopedia by Jonathan Clements and Helen McCarthy, Japan's koala frenzy was sparked by the Tama Zoo in western Tokyo receiving their first koala as the Australian government sent six koalas to Japan as a token of goodwill, but in actuality, the Tama Zoo as well as other zoos in Japan got their koalas because Japan was craving them, and Little Koala and Noozles had already been airing when the koalas arrived in October 1984.

Production notes 
The Japanese animation studio Topcraft, best known for providing animation duties on many of Rankin-Bass' American animated TV specials as well as the feature film The Last Unicorn, worked on Adventures of the Little Koala. Topcraft provided animation assistance for Hayao Miyazaki's 1984 feature film Nausicaä of the Valley of the Wind; in fact, some of the animators who worked on Little Koala also worked on Nausicaa. After Nausicaa, a number of Topcraft animators went on to work for Miyazaki's Studio Ghibli.

Some notable animators who worked on this series included Katsuhisa Yamada and Hidekazu Ohara.

The opening and ending theme songs of the Japanese version were recorded by the all-female rock band Akasaka Komachi, which would later gain fame as Princess Princess.

The series has a total of 26 episodes, each of them contained two 11-minute segments.
 Performed by: Sonja Ball, Shari Chaskin and Maxie Vaughann

Episode list 
 "The Old Clock Tower" / "Mingle Takes A Dive"
 "Is Weather A Frog?" / "Lost in a Race"
 "Ghost Ship" / "Balloon Pamie"
 "The King of the Castle" / "Hang-Gliding With Roobear"
 "The Mysterious Moa Bird" / "Love That Baby Moa!"
 "Snow White and the Seven Koalas" / "Roobear's Invention"
 "Papa on Stilts" / "Detective Roobear"
 "The Dinosaur Egg" / "Treasure Hunt"
 "Pamie Falls in Love" / "The Koala Butterfly"
 "The Koala Bear Gang" / "Back To Nature"
 "Roobear Saves the Day" / "Editor-In-Chief Roobear"
 "Monster Scoop" / "The Biggest Jigsaw Puzzle in the World"
 "Who Will Be the Flower Queen?" / "Circus Day"
 "Roobear the Babysitter" / "Papa Makes a Pie"
 "The Amazing Boomerang" / "The Runaway Hat"
 "Conquering Mt. Breadknife" / "Save the Eucalyptus"
 "Mommy Can Fly" / "The Secret of the McGillicuddy Vase"
 "Heavenly Fireworks" / "Save That Junk"
 "The Winner" / "A Hundred-Year-Old Camera"
 "Nurse Pamie" / "Any Mail Today?"
 "The Writing on the Wall" / "A Ride in a Spaceship"
 "Is Mingle a Nuisance?" / "Allowance Problems"
 "A Whale of a Ride" / "Laura Finds An Egg"
 "A Broken Umbrella" / "Save The Butterflies"
 "The Moon Goddess" / "The Flying Doctor"
 "Eucalyptus Rocket" / "Penguins Don't Fly"

Home media release 
In 1989, Family Home Entertainment released four English-dubbed episodes on a VHS cassette entitled The Adventures of the Little Koala and Friends: Laura and the Mystery Egg, with the episodes "Laura Finds an Egg", "Conquering Mt. Breadknife", "Save the Eucalyptus", and "Mommy Can Fly".

See also 
 Blinky Bill
 Noozles

References

External links 
 
 
 

1984 anime television series debuts
1980s Nickelodeon original programming
Japanese children's animated adventure television series
Japanese children's animated comedy television series
Japanese children's animated fantasy television series
Adventure anime and manga
Animated television series about children
Comedy anime and manga
Nick Jr. original programming
Nickelodeon original programming
Nine Network original programming
Television shows set in Australia
Television series by Cookie Jar Entertainment
Television series about koalas
Topcraft
TV Tokyo original programming
TVNZ 2 original programming
TV1 (Australian TV channel) original programming